The 1994 Jacksonville State Gamecocks football team represented Jacksonville State University as an independent during the 1994 NCAA Division II football season. Led by tenth-year head coach Bill Burgess, the Gamecocks compiled a record of 4–7. Jacksonville State played home games at Paul Snow Stadium in Jacksonville, Alabama. This season was the program's last at the NCAA Division II level as the Gamecocks moved to NCAA Division I-AA competition in 1995.

Schedule

References

Jacksonville State
Jacksonville State Gamecocks football seasons
Jacksonville State Gamecocks football